Alibek Aliyevich Aliev (born 16 August 1996) is a professional footballer who plays as a forward for Swedish club FC Trollhättan. Born in Russia, Aliev represents Sweden internationally.

Early life
Alibek was born in the village of Karabudakhkent to a Kumyk family, Dagestan, and relocated with his family to Sweden at the age of six.

Club career
He started playing football at Bäckefors IF before joining Vänersborgs FK, joining the Elfsborg youth system at the age of 16.

On 22 January 2015, Aliev signed for CSKA Moscow on a five-year contract. On 28 August 2015, Aliev signed for FF Jaro on loan for the remainder of the 2015 Veikkausliiga season.

On 12 February 2018, he moved on a permanent basis from CSKA to Örgryte IS. On 11 August 2018, Aliev joined Dalkurd FF in the Allsvenskan, Sweden's first tier, on loan for the remainder of the season.

Career statistics

References

External links
 
 
 

1996 births
Living people
Russian emigrants to Sweden
Swedish footballers
Footballers from Makhachkala
Association football forwards
IF Elfsborg players
PFC CSKA Moscow players
FF Jaro players
Jakobstads BK players
GAIS players
Örgryte IS players
Dalkurd FF players
Varbergs BoIS players
FC Trollhättan players
Veikkausliiga players
Ykkönen players
Kakkonen players
Allsvenskan players
Superettan players
Sweden youth international footballers
Swedish expatriate footballers
Expatriate footballers in Finland
Swedish expatriate sportspeople in Finland